Von Lojewski is a surname. Notable people with the surname include:

 Günther von Lojewski (1935–2023), German journalist, television presenter, and author
 Wolf von Lojewski (born 1937), German journalist